The 2008 Autobacs Super GT Series was the sixteenth season of the Japan Automobile Federation Super GT Championship including the All Japan Grand Touring Car Championship (JGTC) era and the fourth season as the Super GT series. It marked as well as the twenty-sixth season of a JAF-sanctioned sports car racing championship dating back to the All Japan Sports Prototype Championship.  It is a series for Grand Touring race cars divided into two categories: GT500 and GT300. This was the first season for the new R35 GT-R, replacing the Z which had been used for all GT500 Nissan teams from 2004-2007. The season began on March 15 and ended on November 9, 2008 after 9 races.

Drivers and teams

GT500

GT300

Schedule

Season Winners

Standings

GT500 Drivers
Scoring system

Only the best four results in the first six races would be counted for the championship.
There were no points awarded for pole position and fastest lap in the final race.

Teams

GT300 Class (Top 3)

Drivers

Teams

Footnotes

External links

 Super GT official website 

Super GT seasons
Super GT